Forbidden Forest may refer to:

 The Forbidden Forest, a fictional woodland in the Harry Potter series
 The Forbidden Forest, a 1955 novel by Mircea Eliade
 Forbidden Forest (video game), a Commodore 64 computer game
 Forbidden Forest (film), a 2004 Canadian documentary film
 Forbidden Forest is some sacred forest in Indonesian culture
 The Forbidden Forest, a location in Smurfs: The Lost Village and associated media.

See also 
 The Forest (disambiguation)